Chandrodayam is a 1966 Indian Tamil-language romantic comedy film directed by K. Shankar. The film stars M. G. Ramachandran and J. Jayalalithaa, with M. N. Nambiar and Nagesh in supporting roles. It was inspired by the 1934 American film It Happened One Night, and released on 27 May 1966.

Plot 
Devi, an innocent heiress, runs away from her home, the Selvamani Estate, the day before her engagement, thereby creating a scandal within her family, in particular, for her father, Zamindar Ponnambalam. Being away, abandoned to herself, Devi is saved at the last minute by a reporter, Chandran, who decides to accommodate her at his home until he is able to find her a new home.

Chandran is the news reporter for the newspaper named Dinakkavartchi. Duriothanan, the editor of the newspaper, is an unscrupulous man with no regard for genuine news presentation, and is always in favour for sensationalising news, even if it means concealing the truth. The two very often disagree. Chandran is helped in his quest by his friend, the newspaper's photographer, Alwar.

Chandran wants at all costs to help another young woman, Kamala, wounded cruelly by life since her birth. She had previously been a victim of a predator, the rich Paranthaman. Chandran puts everything in its place by uniting Kamala with Paranthaman and he himself marrying Devi, with the blessings of the elders from both the families. Duriothanan regrets his misdeeds and asks Chandran to start a new newspaper and name it as he wants. The newspaper is named Chandrodayam, the first issue carrying the wedding news of Chandran and Devi.

Cast 
 M. G. Ramachandran as Chandran
 J. Jayalalithaa as Devi
 M. R. Radha as Duriothanan
 M. N. Nambiar as Paranthaman
 Pandari Bai as Lakshmi
 S. A. Ashokan as Ponnambalam
 C. K. Nagesh as Alwar
 C. R. Manorama as Ahalya, wife of Alwar
 Bharathi as Kamala
 S. N. Lakshmi as Maheshwari, mother of Paranthaman
 Kuladeivam Rajagopal as Ekambaram

Production 
Chandrodayam was inspired by the 1934 American film It Happened One Night. It was produced by G. N. Velumani of Saravana Films, directed by K. Shankar, photographed by Thambu and edited by K. Narayanan. The climax fight sequence between M. N. Nambiar and M. G. Ramachandran was shot with the use of only one light source: a rolling, broken small table lamp.

Soundtrack 
The soundtrack is composed by M. S. Viswanathan. The songs "Chandrodayam Oru Pennanatho", "Buddhan Yesu" and "Kaasikum Pogum Sanyasi" were well received. The song "Kaasikum Pogum Sanyasi" is based on Yadhukulakambhoji raga, and "Chandrodayam Oru Pennanatho" is based on Hamir Kalyani.

Release and reception 
Chandrodayam was released on 27 May 1966. Jayalalithaa won the Tamil Nadu Cinema Fan Award for Best Actress.

References

Bibliography

External links 
 

1960s Tamil-language films
1966 films
1966 romantic comedy films
Films about journalists
Films directed by K. Shankar
Films scored by M. S. Viswanathan
Indian remakes of American films
Indian romantic comedy films